The Sex Discrimination (Election Candidates) Act 2002 (c.2) is an Act of the Parliament of the United Kingdom. The purpose of the Act was to exempt the selection of candidates in parliamentary elections from the provisions in the Sex Discrimination Act 1975 and the Sex Discrimination (Northern Ireland) Order 1976 that outlaw sexual discrimination. The purposes of the Act allow political parties to select candidates based on gender in an effort to increase representation of women in British politics.

The Act applies to elections to:
 the House of Commons;
 the Scottish Parliament;
 Senedd Cymru – the Welsh Parliament;
 the Northern Ireland Assembly;
 Local Government Elections (including the London Assembly); and
 until 2019, the European Parliament.

The Act does not apply to selection of candidates for the Mayor of London elections. Only political parties registered under Part 2 of the Political Parties, Elections and Referendums Act 2000 are covered by the Act.

The Act was originally scheduled to run until the end of 2015. A statutory order to extend the deadline may be made if a draft has been laid before, and approved by resolution of, each House of Parliament. On 6 March 2008, Minister for Women Harriet Harman announced that the exemption would be extended until 2030 under the Equality Act 2010.

The Labour Party has used the law to operate all-women shortlists, which were previously illegal under the Sex Discrimination Act 1975.

References

External links
The Sex Discrimination (Election Candidates) Act 2002.
The Sex Discrimination (Election Candidates) Act 2002, as originally enacted, from the Office of Public Sector Information.

United Kingdom Acts of Parliament 2002
Election law in the United Kingdom
Affirmative action in Europe
Anti-discrimination law in the United Kingdom
Election legislation
Women's rights legislation
Sexism
Gender in the United Kingdom
2002 in women's history